The siege of Amida occurred in 502–503, during the Anastasian War. The city was not garrisoned by any troops of the Byzantine Empire but nevertheless resisted for three months before falling to the military of the Sasanian Empire under Kavadh I. According to the detailed account of Zacharias Rhetor, the city's sack was particularly brutal, and accompanied by a massacre of the population for three days and nights. The fall of the city urged the Emperor Anastasius I Dicorus to react militarily, before a truce was agreed between both parts in 505.

Background 

In 502, the Persian king Kavadh I needed money to pay his debts to the Hephthalites who had helped him regain his throne in 498/499. The situation was exacerbated by recent changes in the flow of the Tigris in lower Mesopotamia, sparking famines and flood. When the Roman emperor Anastasius I refused to provide any help, Kavadh tried to gain the money by force.

During the summer 502, Kavadh I invaded Roman Armenia and Mesopotamia with an army which included Armenian and Arab allies. He quickly captured the unprepared city of Theodosiopolis (present-day Erzurum), perhaps with local support; the city was in any case undefended by troops and weakly fortified.

Siege 

Kavadh then besieged the fortress-city of Amida (present-day Diyarbakır) through the autumn and winter (502–503). The siege of the city proved to be a far more difficult enterprise than Kavadh expected. The defenders, although unsupported by troops, repelled the Persian assaults for three months. The city, behind its walls of black basalt, resisted desperately, resorted to cannibalism  before finally succumbing to the siege. The city was being defended by Cyrus, the praeses of Mesopotamia.

Having discovered a weak point in the walls, Kavadh sent a small squad to breach them at night. According to Procopius, the Persians had a stroke of luck in their attempt. Indeed, it seems that some guards were drunk and fell asleep after celebrating a festival, allowing the Persians to quietly scale the walls and get inside the city.

A slaughter of the people of the city followed during three days until a priest went to meet Kavadh, begging him to stop killing, arguing that it was not a kingly act. As Kavadh asked him why they were fighting against him, the priest replied: "Because God willed to give Amida to you not by our decision but by your valour". Then, Kavadh ordered a stop to the slaughter but allowed his men to plunder the city and enslave the survivors. The population was deported to Persia and contributed in re-founding the town of Arrajan.

Aftermath 

Emperor Anastasius I Dicorus reacted to the news of Amida's fall by sending a huge force of 60,000 men east, but the Byzantines were unable to recover the city until the conclusion of a truce in 505, when they ransomed it for 1100 pounds of gold.

References

Sources

502
503
Amida
Amida 502
Amida 502
Amida 502
500s in the Byzantine Empire
6th century in Iran
Anastasian War
Amida
Incidents of cannibalism